The Endotrichini are a tribe of moths of the family Pyralidae described by Émile Louis Ragonot in 1890.

Genera
Endosimilis Whalley, 1961
Endotricha Zeller, 1847 (= Doththa Walker, 1859, Endotrichodes Ragonot, 1891, Endotrichopsis Warren, 1895, Messatis Walker, 1859, Pacoria Walker, 1866, Paconia Walker, 1866, Rhisina Walker, 1866)
Larodryas Turner, 1922
Oenogenes Meyrick, 1884
Persicoptera Meyrick, 1884 (= Perisicoptera Neave, 1940)

References

 
Moth tribes

Taxa named by Émile Louis Ragonot